The Bomu Wildlife Reserve is a wildlife reserve (IUCN Category Ib) in the Democratic Republic of the Congo. The reserve covers an area of 4,125.6 km in Bas-Uélé Province. It extends along the south bank of the Mbomou River, which forms the border with the Central African Republic. It adjoins Bili-Uere Hunting Reserve on the south. Bomu Hunting Reserve is upriver to the east.

References

Protected areas of the Democratic Republic of the Congo
Bas-Uélé
Northeastern Congolian lowland forests